The 1957 European Baseball Championship was held in Germany and was won by the Netherlands for the second championship in a row. Germany finished as runner-up.

Standings

External links
European Championship Archive at honkbalsite (NL)

European Baseball Championship
European Baseball Championship
1957
1957 in German sport
1957